Ash Hill Township is one of ten townships in Butler County, Missouri, USA.  As of the 2010 census, its population was 3,349.

Geography
It contains six cemeteries: Ash Hills, Browns, Hillis, Kelly, Qulin and Vale.

The streams of Blue Spring Slough, Catherine Slough, Cross Slough, Dan River, Lake Slough, Menorkenut Slough Number 16 and Menorkenut Slough Number 19 run through this township.

References

External links
 US-Counties.com
 City-Data.com

Townships in Butler County, Missouri
Townships in Missouri